The 2020 William & Mary Tribe football team represented the College of William & Mary as a member of the Colonial Athletic Association (CAA) in the 2020–21 NCAA Division I FCS football season. The Tribe, led by second-year head coach Mike London, play their home games at Zable Stadium.

On July 17, 2020, the CAA announced that it would not play fall sports due to the COVID-19 pandemic. The conference allowed the option for teams to play as independents for the 2020 season if they still wished to play in the fall.

Previous season
The Tribe finished the 2019 season 5–7, 3–5 in CAA play to finish in a tie for ninth place.

Schedule
William & Mary had games scheduled against Stanford (September 5), Colgate (September 12), and Lafayette (September 19), which were all later canceled before the start of the 2020 season. The CAA released its spring conference schedule on October 27, 2020.

References

William and Mary
William & Mary Tribe football seasons
William and Mary Tribe football